Evil Angel(s) may refer to:

Fallen angel, a term mainly used in Christianity for angels that have been banished from heaven
Evil Angel (studio), a production company for pornographic films owned by John Stagliano
Evil Angels (film), a 1988 film originally released in Australia, known as A Cry in the Dark outside of Australia and New Zealand
Evil Angels (novel), a 1981 novel by Pascal Bruckner
Evil Angels, a 1985 book by John Bryson
Evil Angel (film), a 2009 horror film
"Evil Angel", a song by Rufus Wainwright from his 2001 album Poses
"Evil Angel", a song by Breaking Benjamin from their 2006 album Phobia

See also
 Angel of Evil, 2010 Italian crime film
 Fallen angel (disambiguation)
 Dark Angel (disambiguation)
 Angel of Darkness (disambiguation)
 Angel (disambiguation)
 Evil (disambiguation)